Deshbandhu College is a college established in 1952 and affiliated to University of Delhi. Deshbandhu College was established in 1953 by the Ministry of Rehabilitation, as a memorial to freedom fighter Deshbandhu Gupta.

Academics

Academic programmes

Undergraduate
B.A. (Hons) Economics
B.A. (Hons) English
B.A. (Hons) Hindi
B.A. (Hons) History
B.A. (Hons) Political Science
B.A. (Hons) Sanskrit
B.A. Programme
B.Com.
B.Com. (Hons)
B.Sc. Applied Physical Sciences (Comp. Sc)
B.Sc. Applied Physical Science (Industrial Chemistry)
B.Sc. Life Sciences
B.Sc. Physical Sciences
B.Sc. (Hons) Botany
B.Sc. (Hons) Chemistry
B.Sc. (Hons) Mathematics
B.Sc. (Hons) Physics
B.Sc. (Hons) Biochemistry
B.Sc. (Hons) Zoology

Postgraduate
M.Com.
M.A. Hindi
M.A. English
M.A. Economics
M.A. Mathematics
M.A. Political Science
M.A. Sanskrit
M.Sc. Mathematics

Rankings 
It is ranked 28th among colleges in  India by National Institutional Ranking Framework in 2022.

Student life

Societies
Following is the list of societies of Deshbandhu College (excluding Departmental societies) - 
Deshbandhu Dramatics Society - stage players
Oculis - film society
Deshbandhu Dramatics Society - street theatre
Dialecticians - English debating society
Antdristi - Hindi debating society
Art Meister - art and craft society
Fiontrai - entrepreneurship Cell
Quizzards - quizzing club
Sharpshooters - photography society
YUVA - Youth United for Vision and Action
Timbre - music society
IGNIS - flashmob group
National Cadet Corps
National service scheme
Enactus Deshbandhu
Deshbandhu Express - College media channel owned and run by students
DESH - college magazine
Leaders of tomorrow - NGO

Events
Deshbandhu College organises its annual fest Sabrang in even semesters. Each department has their societies which organise seminars and lectures by eminent scholars and scientists.

Notable people

Notable faculty
 Om Prakash Kohli, former member of Rajya Sabha, Governor of Gujarat
 Ravish Kumar, Ramon Magsaysay Awardee

Notable alumni
 Prabhu Chawla, editorial director of The New Indian Express
 Rajiv Goswami (d. 2004), president of Delhi University Students Union
 Gulshan Kumar, founder of the T-Series music label; Bollywood movie producer
 Ravish Kumar,  journalist, news anchor at NDTV
 Shantanu Moitra, music composer, National Film Award winner for music direction
 Raghu Ram, producer of MTV's Roadies
 Ajay Dutt, MLA, Delhi Legislative Assembly
 Sahil Uppal, Actor
 Ashok Lavasa, former Election commissioner of India
 Late Major Udai Singh(Shaurya Chakra, Sena Medal)

See also
Education in India
Literacy in India
List of institutions of higher education in Delhi

References

External links
 Official website of Deshbandhu College
 Delhi University website profile of Deshbandhu College

Universities and colleges in Delhi
South Delhi district
Educational institutions established in 1952
Delhi University
1952 establishments in India